Aleochara asiatica is a species of rove beetle in the family Staphylinidae.  It was first described in 1859 by Ernst Gustav Kraatz, who stated it was not uncommon in Ceylon (Sri Lanka). It is found in Asia.

References

Aleocharinae
Beetles described in 1859
Taxa named by Ernst Gustav Kraatz